Ľuboš Križko (born August 9, 1979) is an Olympic swimmer from Trenčín, Slovakia who competes in men's 100 meter backstroke. He finished 13th at the 2008 Summer Olympics in Beijing and tied for 27th at the 2004 Summer Olympics in Athens.

At the 2010 European Aquatics Championships, Križko tested positive for tamoxifen and has been banned for two years (retroactive September 22, 2010).

References

External links
 Biography and Statistics

Olympic swimmers of Slovakia
Swimmers at the 2004 Summer Olympics
Swimmers at the 2008 Summer Olympics
Slovak male swimmers
1979 births
Living people
Sportspeople from Trenčín
European Aquatics Championships medalists in swimming
Slovak sportspeople in doping cases